Heather Wright (born 1950) is an English actress, noted for her performances in film and television. Her film credits include Psychomania (1973), The Belstone Fox (1973), Shout at the Devil (1976) and Inseminoid (1981). On television, she has been seen in the following series: Arthur of the Britons, Survivors, Return of the Saint, Blake's 7, The Inheritors, Emmerdale, Holby City, Casualty, The Bill, Midsomer Murders and Broken. Wright is fluent in French, and has also had many acting parts on French TV.

Partial filmography
The Belstone Fox (1973) - Jenny Smith
Psychomania (1973) - Girl with Parcel
Shout at the Devil (1976) - Cynthia Smythe
Inseminoid (1981) - Sharon
Angus, Thongs and Perfect Snogging (2008) - Receptionist
Coffee Sex You (2014) - Maria's Mother

External links

References

English film actresses
English television actresses
Living people
Place of birth missing (living people)
20th-century English actresses
1950 births